= Chanched =

- village
- Location within Madhya Pradesh Location within India
- Coordinates: 23.388604°N 77.4558554°E
- Country: India
- State: Madhya Pradesh
- District: Bhopal
- Tehsil: Huzur
- Elevation: 473 m (1,552 ft)

Population (2011)
  - Total: 164
- Time zone: UTC+5:30 (IST)
- ISO 3166 code: MP-IN
- 2011 census code: 482407

Chanched is a village in the Bhopal district of Madhya Pradesh, India. It is located in the Huzur tehsil and the Phanda block.

== Demographics ==
According to the 2011 census of India, Chanched has 35 households. The effective literacy rate (i.e. the literacy rate of population excluding children aged 6 and below) is 74.64%.

Demographics (2011 Census)
	Total	Male	Female
Population	164	93	71
Children aged below 6 years	26	18	8
Scheduled caste	69	41	28
Scheduled tribe	0	0	0
Literates	103	57	46
Workers (all)	100	57	43
Main workers (total)	46	28	18
Main workers: Cultivators	11	8	3
Main workers: Agricultural labourers	34	20	14
Main workers: Household industry workers	0	0	0
Main workers: Other	1	0	1
Marginal workers (total)	54	29	25
Marginal workers: Cultivators	6	3	3
Marginal workers: Agricultural labourers	43	24	19
Marginal workers: Household industry workers	0	0	0
Marginal workers: Others	5	2	3
Non-workers	64	36	28
